Simon Richards (born 28 January 1964) is a New Zealand former cricketer. He played five first-class and five List A matches for Otago between 1983 and 1985.

See also
 List of Otago representative cricketers

References

External links
 

1964 births
Living people
New Zealand cricketers
Otago cricketers
Cricketers from Dunedin